Raza may refer to:
 Ahmed Raza Khan Barelvi Islamic reformer
Raza (film), a 1942 Spanish film
S. H. Raza (1922–2016), Indian artist
Sardar Muhammad Raza, former Chief Election Commissioner of Pakistan
Raheel Raza (born 1949), Canadian author and feminist
Raza Longknife, a Marvel comic book character
Raza Microelectronics Inc, a private semiconductor company in California
Raza Odiada, a 1995 album by Brujeria
Raza Unida Party, an American political party
Mass (liturgy) in the Assyrian Church of the East, from the Aramaic

See also 
 Reza (disambiguation)
 La Raza (disambiguation)
 Rasa (disambiguation)